Olulis lactigutta is a moth of the family Noctuidae.

References

Moths of Asia
Moths described in 1907